D-Con (standing for Dundee Convention) was an anime convention held in Dundee, Scotland. It was the UK's highest attended free anime convention. D-Con was an annual event run around the end of February/beginning of March, and showcased events for fans of anime, art and video game culture.

History

D-CON was founded by Kieran Baxter, Sarah Dargie, Yibao Gao  and Jamie Keddie in late 2008. It first ran on 28 February 2009 and attracted 350 guests. This made it the highest attended anime convention in Scotland, followed closely in numbers by another Scottish convention, Auchinawa.

The second D-CON was held on 6–7 March 2010, where over 2000 guests attended the convention in the course of the weekend. Video-gaming companies, Gamestation and Realtime Worlds, sent representatives to the event to give talks. An early showing of Final Fantasy XIII was also given in the gaming room.

D-CON 2011 saw a higher attendance again. A preview of the Nintendo 3DS was given as well as Kendo demonstrations along with many other events similar to the previous 2010 event.

A gap year was taken in 2012 with the president, Jamie Keddie, and co-founders agreeing to return in 2013.

Programming
The D-CON's list of events includes:
 Artists Alley
 Gaming Room
 Live Chiptune Music
 Letraset Drawing Area
 MVM Films Cinema Room
 Guitar Hero Free Play
 Dance Dance Revolution Free Play
 Yu-Gi-Oh! Trading Card Game tournament
 Wii tournaments
 PlayStation tournaments
 Xbox 360 tournaments
 Handmade Cosplay Contest
 Kendo Demonstrations
 501st Legion UK Garrison photoshoot
 Digital Art Tutorials
 Deano, Dazza and Cams Pub

See also
 AUKcon

Notes

References

The Dundee Courier Newspaper - Article: Anime event draws crowds March 2010 (offline)
ImagineFX magazine issue 52 - Article: Free manga con January 2010 (offline)
Neo (magazine) issue 82 - Article: Events February 2011 (offline)
News Article on D-CON.
News Article on D-CON

External links
 
 

Defunct anime conventions
British fan conventions